Pasara (also, Pas-see-roo) is a former Karok settlement in Humboldt County, California. It was located on the Klamath River; its precise location is unknown.

References

Former settlements in Humboldt County, California
Former Native American populated places in California
Karuk villages